Drew Cameron Ginn OAM (born 20 November 1974) is an Australian five-time world champion rower, a four time Olympian and triple Olympic gold medallist. From 1995 to 1998 he was a member of Australia's prominent world class crew – the coxless four known as the Oarsome Foursome.

Club and state rowing 
Ginn was educated at Scotch College, Melbourne where he took up rowing. His senior club rowing was done from the Mercantile Rowing Club in Melbourne.

His first state selection for Victoria came in the 1993 youth eight contesting the Noel Wilkinson Trophy in the Interstate Regatta at the Australian Rowing Championships. He rowed again in the Victorian youth eight in 1994, this time to victory in the Interstate Regatta. On twelve occasions between 1995 and 2008 he was selected in the Victorian senior men's eight to contest the King's Cup at the Interstate Regatta. Eight of those Victorian eights saw King's Cup victories and Ginn stroked three King's Cup eights, two to victory.

National representative rowing 
Ginn made his Australian representative debut in the 1994 U23 Trans Tasman series against New Zealand. He rowed in the Australian eight which won two of the three match races in the series. In 1994 he also contested the World Rowing U23 Championships in Paris rowing in the men's eight. In 1995 he first contested senior World Rowing Championships rowing in the men's eight to an eleventh placing in Tampere, Finland.

Ginn won gold in the men's coxless four at the Atlanta 1996 Summer Olympics as part of Australia's Oarsome Foursome, along with Mike McKay, James Tomkins, and Nicholas Green – Ginn replaced the retired Andrew Cooper. In 1997 he secured a seat in the Australian men's senior eight. He raced at the World Rowing Cup I in Lucerne that year and then at the 1997 World Rowing Championships in Aiguebelette, France he rowed in the seven seat for their third placing in the final and to a bronze medal. Ginn's 1997 season in the Australian eight also included a campaign at the Henley Royal Regatta where as an Australian Institute of Sport crew they contested and won the 1997 Grand Challenge Cup.

At the 1998 World Championships, back in the Oarsome Foursome Ginn raced and won the men's coxed four world title with Brett Hayman in the stern. Mike McKay and Ginn also took a silver medal at that same regatta as a coxless pair. In 1999, the foursome would go on to try out, but lose the 1999 Australian selection trials in a coxless four. Tomkins and Ginn decided to switch to a coxless pair and won the 1999 World Championship in St Catharines Canada.

Ginn and James Tomkins had planned to race the straight pair at the Sydney 2000 Summer Olympics, but Ginn suffered a severe back injury, forcing him to withdraw from the boat. In 2002, he returned to the water, teaming up with fellow Oarsome Foursome rower James Tomkins in a coxless pair; they finished fourth in the 2002 World Championships.  In 2003, Ginn and Tomkins were the surprise winners, beating the British favourites—and defending champions—Matthew Pinsent and James Cracknell, which was a factor in Pinsent and Cracknell choosing to move to the coxless fours.  At the 2004 Summer Olympics, Ginn and Tomkins won the gold medal in the coxless pairs.

In 2006, Ginn made a return to international competition at the 2006 World Rowing Championships held at Dorney Lake, Eton.  He and new pairs partner Duncan Free were able to win despite choppy tail conditions. In 2007 Ginn and Free successfully defended their coxless pairs title, posting a time of 6:24.87 minutes — almost 6 secs ahead of their New Zealand rivals (Nathan Twaddle and George Bridgewater) who had stuck with them for the first 1000 m before dropping behind to take the silver.

Early in 2008 Drew Ginn and his 2007 World Champion partner Free, were pre-selected to compete for Australia at the 2008 Beijing Olympic Games where they won the gold medal as a coxless pair. 
At the 2012 London Olympics, Ginn won a silver medal in the Australian men's coxless four, behind the all-conquering Great Britain men's four, who went on to win gold in their fourth consecutive Olympics.

Cycling career
In 2009 Ginn took up competitive road bicycle racing, with immediate success, particularly in the discipline of the time trial. He won the 2009 Oceania time trial championships. However, in downplaying the achievement, Ginn noted two riders in the under-23 competition actually posted faster times over the same course on the same day.

In a much stronger field at the 2010 Australian national road championships, Ginn finished sixth.

Accolades
Ginn was awarded the Medal of the Order of Australia (OAM) in the 1997 Australia Day Honours and the Australian Sports Medal in June 2000.

Scotch College, Melbourne, Ginn's former school, named a racing eight "Drew Ginn" in his honour.  The school's first VIII won the APS Head of the River (Australia) in that boat in 1998.

In 2003 together with James Tomkins he was named with FISA male rower of the year. In 2004 he was appointed as an Athletes Commission member to the Australian Olympic Committee. In 2007 jointly with Duncan Free he was named FISA male rower of the year.

In 2010, Ginn was inducted as a member of the Rowing Victoria Hall of Fame.

In 2014,  the International Rowing Federation awarded Ginn the Thomas Keller Medal for his outstanding international rowing career. It is the sport's highest honour and is awarded within five years of the athlete's retirement, acknowledging an exceptional rowing career and exemplary sportsmanship.

In October 2018, he was inducted into the Sport Australia Hall of Fame.

Rowing palmarès

Olympics

1996 Atlanta Olympics M4- bow – gold
2004 Athens Olympics M2- bow – gold

2008 Beijing Olympics M2- bow – gold
2012 London Olympics M4- three seat – silver

World Championships

 1994 Trans Tasman Under 23 Series Men's eight
 1994 World Rowing U23 Championships Men's eight
1995 World Rowing Championships Men's eight bow – eleventh
1997 World Rowing Championships Men's eight seven seat – bronze
1998 World Rowing Championships Coxed four three seat – gold
1998 World Rowing Championships Coxless pair stroke – silver

1999 World Rowing Championships Coxless pair bow – gold
2002 World Rowing Championships Coxless pair – bow – fourth
2003 World Rowing Championships Coxless pair bow – gold
2006 World Rowing Championships Coxless pair bow – gold
2007 World Rowing Championships Coxless pair bow – gold

National Interstate Regatta

 1993 – Interstate Men's Youth Eight Championship five seat – Second
 1994 – Interstate Men's Youth Eight Championship six seat – First
 1995 – Interstate Men's Eight Championship three seat – First
 1996 – Interstate Men's Eight Championship five seat – First
 1997 – Interstate Men's Eight Championship six seat – Third
 1998 – Interstate Men's Eight Championship six seat – First
 1999 – Interstate Men's Eight Championship six seat – Second

 2000 – Interstate Men's Eight Championship – First
 2002 – Interstate Men's Eight Championship seven seat – First
 2003 – Interstate Men's Eight Championship seven seat – First
 2004 – Interstate Men's Eight Championship seven seat – Second
 2006 – Interstate Men's Eight Championship stroke – First
 2007 – Interstate Men's Eight Championship stroke – First
 2008 – Interstate Men's Eight Championship stroke – Second

References

External links
 
 Drew Ginn's Personal Blog
 Australian Rowing History

Olympic medalists in rowing
Rowers at the 1996 Summer Olympics
Rowers at the 2004 Summer Olympics
Rowers at the 2008 Summer Olympics
Rowers at the 2012 Summer Olympics
Olympic gold medalists for Australia
1974 births
Living people
People educated at Scotch College, Melbourne
Australian male rowers
Olympic silver medalists for Australia
Medalists at the 2012 Summer Olympics
Medalists at the 2008 Summer Olympics
Medalists at the 2004 Summer Olympics
World Rowing Championships medalists for Australia
Medalists at the 1996 Summer Olympics
Thomas Keller Medal recipients
Sport Australia Hall of Fame inductees
Recipients of the Medal of the Order of Australia
Recipients of the Australian Sports Medal